Dallas is located in  North Texas, built along the Trinity River. It has a humid subtropical climate (Köppen climate classification: Cfa) that is characteristic of the southern plains of the United States. Dallas experiences mild winters and hot summers.

Seasonal climate

Summer 
Summers are very hot and humid, with extended periods of both wet and dry weather possible. Heat waves can be severe. During the summer, the region receives warm and dry winds from the north and west, as well as hot, humid air from the Gulf of Mexico. The city's all-time recorded high temperature is  during the Heat Wave of 1980.

Transitional months 

Spring and autumn bring warm weather to the area. Vibrant wildflowers (such as the bluebonnet, Indian paintbrush and other flora) bloom in spring and are planted around the highways throughout Texas. Springtime weather can be quite volatile, but temperatures themselves are warm on average. The weather in Dallas is also generally pleasant between late October and early December, and unlike springtime, major storms rarely form in the area.

In the spring, cool fronts moving south from Canada collide with warm, humid air streaming in from the Gulf Coast. When these fronts meet over north central Texas, severe thunderstorms are generated with spectacular lightning shows, torrents of rain, hail, and occasionally, tornadoes (Dallas is located at the lower-end of the Tornado Alley).

Winter 

On the other hand, a couple of times each year, warm and humid air from the south overrides cold, dry air, leading to freezing rain, which often causes major disruptions in the city if the roads and highways become slick.

Data

Snow 
There are two to three days with hail per year, but snowfall is rare. Based on records from 1898 to 2019, the average snowfall is 2.6 inches per year. It has snowed twice during Thanksgiving day NFL football games at Texas Stadium, in 1993 and 2007, which is comparatively early. The month with the highest snowfall is typically February, with an average of 0.6 inches falling. While the month with the highest number of days with snow falling is typically January, with an average of 0.5 days of snow. The record snowfall was recorded in February 2010, when 12.5 inches of snow fell over two days at the Dallas-Fort Worth International airport.

Volatile weather

Tornadoes 

Since Dallas lies at the lower end of the "Tornado Alley", tornadoes have on occasion been a threat to the city. Most tornadoes hit the city during the months of April and May. Dallas was hit by a powerful tornado on April 2, 1957. The tornado would have likely been an F3. On March 28, 2000, the “Fort Worth Tornado” impacted Dallas's neighbor Fort Worth's downtown, and a tornado in Arlington, Texas also occurred that day damaging some homes. Four people died in Fort Worth as a result of the tornado. That day was the Metroplex's most damaging tornado outbreak since the 1957 event. Another widespread tornado outbreak struck the area in the Dallas tornado outbreak of April 3, 2012, slightly damaging Rangers Ballpark in Arlington and damaging some planes and grounding the others at Dallas/Fort Worth International Airport and Dallas Love Field, heavily damaging an elementary school, and destroying semis in a facility. On December 26, 2015, a rare winter tornado outbreak led to spawning several tornadoes, including an EF-4 tornado near the city of Garland and Rowlett that caused 10 deaths. On October 21, 2019, 10 tornadoes touched down in the Dallas-Fort Worth Metroplex, including an EF-3 tornado that devastated areas from North Dallas to Richardson.

Floods 
Major flooding occurred on the Trinity River in the years 1844, 1866, 1871, and 1890, but a major event in the spring of 1908 set in motion the harnessing of the river. Five people died, 4,000 were left homeless, and property damages were estimated at $2.5 million.

Dallas was without power for three days, all telephone and telegraph service was down, and rail service was canceled.  The only way to reach Oak Cliff was by boat.  West Dallas was hit harder than any other part of the city—the Dallas Times Herald said "indescribable suffering" plagued the area.  Much to the horror of residents, thousands of livestock drowned in the flood and some became lodged in the tops of trees—the stench of their decay hung over the city as the water subsided.

After the disastrous flood, the city wanted to find a way to control the reckless Trinity and to build a bridge linking Oak Cliff and Dallas.  The immediate reaction was citizens and the city clamoring to build an indestructible, all-weather crossing over the Trinity.  This had already been tried following the 1890 flood—the result was the "Long Wooden Bridge" that connected Jefferson Boulevard in Oak Cliff and Cadiz in Dallas, but the resulting unstable bridge was easily washed away by the 1908 flood.  George B. Dealey, publisher of the Dallas Morning News, proposed a  concrete bridge based on a bridge crossing the Missouri River in Kansas City.  Ultimately a US$650,000 bond election was approved and in 1912, the Oak Cliff viaduct (now the Houston Street viaduct) was opened among festivities drawing 58,000 spectators.  The bridge, at the time, was the longest concrete structure in the world.

In May 2015, the Dallas-Fort Worth Airport received a record-shattering 16.96 inches of rainfall, in a month that obliterated heavy-rainfall records virtually throughout the Southern Plains (Texas and Oklahoma, especially).  Strangely enough, a very hot, dry summer followed, resulting in some parts of Texas returning to abnormally dry conditions as early as July 2015, soon after the record May rains erased years-long drought conditions over the area.

El Niño–Southern Oscillation
The El Niño–Southern Oscillation (ENSO) determines for the most part what the winter and spring months are like in Dallas. During the warm phase (El Niño), winter and spring are colder and receive more snow than usual. Under the cold phase (La Niña), winter and spring are warmer and receive less snow.

Notes

References

Dallas
Dallas
Climate of Texas